Log House, Hiester House, and Market Annex is a historic building located at Reading, Berks County, Pennsylvania.  The Log House was built about 1760, and is a -story, dwelling measuring 25 feet by 30 feet.  The pine logs are chinked with cut stone and mortar, with notch and saddle corner construction.  The John Hiester House was built about 1820, and is a -story, two-bay brick dwelling measuring 17 feet by 34 feet.  It is located to the rear of the Log House and both were used for commercial activities in the 19th century.  To the rear of the Hiester House is the West Reading Market Annex built in 1895.  It is a brick market house measuring 165 feet long and 30 feet wide.  The complex is the home of The Speckled Hen Cottage Pub and Alehouse.

It was listed on the National Register of Historic Places in 1979.

References

External links
The Speckled Hen Cottage Pub and Alehouse website

Buildings and structures in Reading, Pennsylvania
Houses on the National Register of Historic Places in Pennsylvania
Houses completed in 1760
Houses completed in 1820
Commercial buildings completed in 1895
Commercial buildings on the National Register of Historic Places in Pennsylvania
Houses in Berks County, Pennsylvania
National Register of Historic Places in Reading, Pennsylvania